Black Enterprise Business Report is a weekly television show produced by Black Enterprise, Inc..  It airs across a range of United States local television stations on varying times and days of the week.  Black Enterprise also produces another show titled Our World with Black Enterprise.

External links

 Black Enterprise Business Report
 

Business-related television series
African-American news and public affairs television series